The Gerhardt Cycleplane has been called the world's first successful human-powered aircraft. It was designed by Dr. William Frederick Gerhardt (January 31, 1896 – March 15, 1984), and assembled by the staff of the Flight Test Section at McCook Field in Dayton, Ohio. It was flown in 1923.

History
The Gerhardt Cycleplane was developed in 1923 by Dr. William F. Gerhardt, head of the Aeronautical Engineering Department at the University of Michigan. While working as an aeronautical engineer at McCook Field, Dr. Gerhardt designed the Cycleplane during his off-duty hours. The Cycleplane was one of many civilian aircraft projects developed at McCook Field by the base's engineers and test staff. The concept was to produce an aircraft capable of maintaining stable, level flight by human-power alone.

The Cycleplane was constructed using private funds by members of the McCook Field Flight Test Section. Preliminary construction took place in secrecy in a barn loft. Officials from the base's Engineering Section later allowed Gerhardt and his crew to move into the McCook Field helicopter hangar for the aircraft's final assembly and storage.

The Cycleplane had seven narrow vertically mounted wings, two attached to the small wood-and-fabric fuselage, and the other five stacked above it to a height of nearly 15 feet. A single pilot sat in an open cockpit near the wing roots where he pedaled a bicycle gear attached to a large two-bladed propeller.

Operation
The aircraft made its first flight in July 1923. During initiate flight tests, an automobile towed the Cyleplane into the air and released it. Afterward Gerhardt was able to maintain stable, level flights for short periods of time.

News reel footage
The Gerhardt Cycleplane is perhaps best remembered, and to some extent made infamous, by a news reel film made in 1923 that shows the tall aircraft's seven wings collapsing while the aircraft was being pushed on the ground. The fuselage tipped over and the aircraft came to rest on its side. Today, this footage is often shown in compilations along with other ill-fated attempts at human flight from the pioneering days of aviation (most notably the Pitts Sky Car). The scene is also shown in some famous movies, most notably Those Magnificent Men in Their Flying Machines, And Now for Something Completely Different and Airplane!.

Specifications

See also

References

External links
 Newsreel footage at British Pathe

1920s United States experimental aircraft
Aircraft manufactured in the United States
History of Dayton, Ohio
Human-powered aircraft
Single-engined tractor aircraft
Multiplane aircraft